Białuty  is a village in the administrative district of Gmina Iłowo-Osada, within Działdowo County, Warmian-Masurian Voivodeship, in northern Poland.

The village has a population of 600.

The nearby Białuty Forest in July 2022 saw two mass graves of about 17 tonnes of human ashes located, estimated to be at least that of 8000 persons most of whom were inmates of the Soldau concentration camp (1940–1944).

References

Villages in Działdowo County